LGBTQ Veterans Memorial may refer to;

 A monument honoring LGBT veterans at the Abraham Lincoln National Cemetery in Elwood, Illinois
 California LGBTQ Veterans Memorial, at Desert Memorial Park in Cathedral City, California